The Parliament of the Republic North Ossetia–Alania is the regional parliament of North Ossetia–Alania, a federal subject of Russia. A total of 70 deputies are elected for five-year terms.

The presiding officer is the Chairman of the Parliament of North Ossetia–Alania.

Elections

2017

2022

See also
List of Chairmen of the Parliament of North Ossetia–Alania

Notes

References

Politics of North Ossetia–Alania
North Ossetia
North Ossetia-Alania